The John Brand Jr. House is a historic house located at 351 Maple Avenue in Elmira, Chemung County, New York.

Description and history 
It was built in 1890, and is a large -story, Queen Anne–style dwelling. It features a large scale Palladian window on the west gable end. The house was designed by Elmira architect Otis Dockstader and his associate Joseph H. Considine.

It was listed on the National Register of Historic Places on February 22, 2010. It is located in the Maple Avenue Historic District.

References

Queen Anne architecture in New York (state)
Houses completed in 1890
Houses on the National Register of Historic Places in New York (state)
Houses in Chemung County, New York
Buildings and structures in Elmira, New York
National Register of Historic Places in Chemung County, New York
Historic district contributing properties in New York (state)